Peter Hlinka (born 5 December 1978 in Prešov) is a retired Slovak football midfielder and currently the manager of SFC Opava.

He competed for Slovakia in football at the 2000 Summer Olympics.

References

External links
 
 
 
 
 

1978 births
Living people
Sportspeople from Prešov
Slovak footballers
Slovakia under-21 international footballers
Slovakia international footballers
SK Sturm Graz players
FC Augsburg players
SK Rapid Wien players
FK Austria Wien players
SC Wiener Neustadt players
2. Bundesliga players
Austrian Football Bundesliga players
Slovak expatriate footballers
Expatriate footballers in Germany
Expatriate footballers in Austria
Slovak expatriate sportspeople in Austria
Slovak expatriate sportspeople in Germany
Olympic footballers of Slovakia
Footballers at the 2000 Summer Olympics
Association football midfielders
Expatriate football managers in Austria
First Vienna FC managers
Slovak Super Liga managers
AS Trenčín managers
Slovak football managers
SFC Opava managers
Expatriate football managers in the Czech Republic
Czech National Football League managers
Slovak expatriate sportspeople in the Czech Republic